"Stand Up" is a song written by Australian rock musician Jimmy Barnes and Jeff Neill. Released by Barnes in March 1993 as the second single from his sixth studio album, Heat. The song peaked at number 41 on the ARIA charts.

Track listing
 CD Single (D12094)
 "Stand Up" - 4:10
 "Lay Down Your Guns" - 4:00	
 "Little Darling" - 4:33

Charts

References

Mushroom Records singles
1993 singles
1992 songs
Jimmy Barnes songs
Song recordings produced by Don Gehman
Songs written by Jimmy Barnes